Yunuslar is a village in the Burhaniye district of Balıkesir Province in Turkey.

History 
While Yunuslar used to belong to Gömeç district, it was transferred to Burhaniye district with the decision of the Ministry of Interior on December 31, 1991.

References

Villages in Burhaniye District